Paris Andriopoulos (born 18 March 1994) is a Greek professional footballer who plays as a forward.

External links
 e-AEL Official
 Videos@Aelole
 Crimson Scorer

1994 births
Living people
Greek footballers
Association football forwards
PAOK FC players
Pierikos F.C. players
Athlitiki Enosi Larissa F.C. players
Olympiakos Nicosia players
Greek expatriate footballers
Expatriate footballers in Cyprus
Cypriot Second Division players
Football League (Greece) players
Footballers from Thessaloniki